A fishing expedition is an informal, pejorative term for a non-specific search for information, especially incriminating information. It is most frequently organized by policing authorities.

Media
In the UK, Abu Hamza and Yaser al-Sirri, Jim Davidson, and the late Edward Heath were described in media as having been subjected to this tactic.

Former friends of the late prime minister Edward Heath complained that Mike Veale, Chief Constable of Wiltshire Police, had mounted a 'fishing expedition' in an 'unsatisfactory and prejudicial' investigation costing £1.5 million which had turned up 'no convincing evidence' that Heath had ever sexually assaulted anyone, according to Lord Hunt of Wirral.

Law
In pre-trial procedure, so-called "fishing expeditions" are massive and aimless calls for all documents related to the litigation: in the United States they are permissible under Federal Rule of Civil Procedure 26 (b) (1). This rule is repeated in many states' rules of procedure: "Parties may obtain discovery regarding any matter, not privileged, which is relevant ... if the information sought appears reasonably calculated to lead to the discovery of admissible evidence."  The looseness of the definition of relevant evidence is generally construed to mean "liberal" production.

«The only constitutional limitation on the search by subpoena is that it not be hopelessly broad or severely burdensome. If compliance would require the production of virtually all the records of a business, or if the burden of sorting through the records would nearly bring the ordinary operation of the business to a halt, the subpoena is invalid. Maybe the confusion is in the use of the metaphor "fishing expedition." The term is used to characterize the vague or over-inclusive subpoena».

See also
 Dragnet (policing)
 Duces tecum
 Presumption of guilt
 Trial by media
 Witch-hunt

References

Mass media
Informal legal terminology